Hart Glacier is a small hanging glacier on the south wall of Wright Valley, Victoria Land, Antarctica, between Meserve Glacier and Goodspeed Glacier. It was named by U.S. geologist Robert Nichols for Roger Hart, a geological assistant to Nichols at nearby Marble Point in the 1959–60 field season.

Further reading
 Gunter Faure, Teresa M. Mensing,  The Transantarctic Mountains: Rocks, Ice, Meteorites and Water, P 716
 Denton, George H., Sugden David, E., Marchant, David R., Hall, Brenda L. and Wilch, Thomas I., EAST ANTARCTIC ICE SHEET SENSITIVITY TO PLIOCENE CLIMATIC CHANGE FROM A DRY VALLEYS PERSPECTIVE ,  Geogr. Ann. 75 A (4): 155–204, P 192

References

Glaciers of McMurdo Dry Valleys